The Great British Baking Show (season 3) may refer to:

 The Great British Bake Off (series 3), broadcast as the fifth season on PBS in the United States
 The Great British Bake Off (series 6), broadcast as the third season on PBS in the United States

See also
 The Great British Baking Show (season 5) (disambiguation)